Kim Hye-jun (born May 8, 1995) is a South Korean actress. She is best known for her role in Kingdom as Queen Consort Cho. She won Best New Actress at the 40th Blue Dragon Film Awards for her role in Another Child. In 2021, she gained further recognition for her role as Song Yi-kyung or 'K' in Inspector Koo for which she won Best New Actress – Television at the 58th Baeksang Arts Awards the following year. Her other works include Matrimonial Chaos and Rain or Shine.

Career 
She first appeared in commercials in 2015 and was still studying theater and film at Hanyang University when she debuted in the lesbian romance web series Lily Fever. Determined to go to as many auditions as possible in order to gain experience, she unexpectedly passed one for Saturday Night Live Korea, although she had always considered herself to have no talent for comedy, and so joined the regular cast of the TV show in 2016. Having made her name participating in several popular skits, she left the show at the end of the season in June. She starred in several short movies such as A Transfer Student and appearing as support in a few TV series.

She landed her first role in a feature film in After Spring. In 2018, Kim was cast as one of the main characters in Netflix Original series Kingdom, portraying the unusual character of an ambitious teenage queen who is expecting the heir of the throne. In late 2018, she reunited with Bae Doona in the TV series Matrimonial Chaos, playing Bae's younger sister. Although Kim's acting in Kingdom was criticized by some viewers who would find it inconsistent with the much codified period piece genre, she was praised just a few months later for her performance as one of the leads in Another Child, the directorial debut of Kim Yun-seok. 

In 2020, she got a lead role in the black comedy mystery MBC television series Chip In (2020), alongside Oh Na-ra, in which she won Best New Actress at the 2020 MBC Drama Awards. In 2021, Kim was cast one of the lead roles alongside Lee Young-ae in JTBC produced mystery thriller Inspector Koo, in which Kim portrays a college student who is secretly a ruthless serial killer.

In 2022, She will be appearing in the Disney+ drama Connect which is scheduled to air in December.

Filmography

Films

Television series

Web series

Television shows

Awards and nominations

References

External links 
 

1995 births
Living people
21st-century South Korean actresses
South Korean film actresses
South Korean television actresses
Best New Actress Paeksang Arts Award (television) winners